State Trunk Highway 81 (often called Highway 81, STH-81 or WIS 81) is a state highway in the U.S. state of Wisconsin. It runs east–west in southwest and south central Wisconsin from Beloit to Cassville. The route was originally designated as a state highway in the early 1920s, but there were three different designations along the route. It was not signed as WIS 81 along the entire route until 1934.

Route description
The highway begins at an intersection with WIS 133 in Cassville, a village along the Mississippi River bordering Iowa, and runs northeastward from it. It intersects County Trunk Highway U (CTH-U) in Beetown and then running concurrently with WIS 33 along the Grant River west of Five Points. From there, it continues running northeast, intersecting with CTH-N before reaching Lancaster, where it starts running concurrently with US Highway 61 (US 61). It then runs southeastward, meeting WIS 129, an eastern bypass of Lancaster, before exiting its concurrencies with US 61 and WIS 33. From there. it continues running southeast, passing the community of Ellenboro and running concurrently with CTH-D before entering Platteville along Lancaster Street. The highway then runs along a few of the streets in Platteville and ends its concurrency with CTH-D before starting another concurrency with WIS 80.

The highway runs southeasterly along the WIS 80 concurrency, intersecting with Business US 151 (Bus. US 151) before passing through an interchange with US 151. It then curves to the south, passing by Platteville Municipal Airport before exiting its concurrency with WIS 80 and running east from it. The highway runs directly eastward, passing by Elk Grove and intersecting with WIS 126 and numerous county trunk highways before running along a short concurrency with WIS 23 in Darlington. From there, it runs along the Pecatonica River before it runs south of the highway, and the highway runs east, passing through the community of Lamont before running along a short concurrency with WIS 78 in Argyle.

East of Argyle, the highway runs southeasterly towards Monroe before running concurrently with WIS 11 along a bypass alignment just north of Monroe. The concurrency runs east, passing by Juda before the highway leaves the concurrency and runs southeast from it. The highway curves east in Newark before entering Beloit along Liberty Avenue. West of the Rock River, the highway follows a short concurrency with WIS 213. After crossing the Rock River, the highway intersects US 51 before running northeast from it and terminating at an interchange with Interstate 39/Interstate 90 (I-39/I-90) and continuing as I-43.

History
The route first appeared as a state trunk highway in the early 1920s, but was split into three differently designated segments: from Cassville to the beginning of the WIS 35 (then WIS 65) concurrency, it was WIS 105; from the beginning of said concurrency to Monroe, it was part of WIS 65; and from the end of the WIS 11 (then WIS 20), it was part of WIS 61. In 1924, the entire route was signed as a western extension of WIS 61. In 1927, the highway, along with the rest of WIS 61, had been renumbered to WIS 14. In 1934, when US 14 was designated within the state, the entire route was renumbered to WIS 81. Between 1948 and 1956, the entire route within Grant County was paved. The sections which were not paved in 1956 were the entire route in Lafayette County, between the WIS 11 concurrency and Newark, and a short section along the WIS 11 concurrency near Juda.

In 2021, the eastern terminus of the highway was extended to I-43's exit 1 (County Route X) and the interchange at I-39/90 was changed to a Diverging Diamond Interchange. I-43 now terminates at a Directional T Interchange at I-39/90 and the eastern terminus at I-43 is now a Dumbbell interchange.

Major junctions

See also

References

081
Transportation in Grant County, Wisconsin
Transportation in Lafayette County, Wisconsin
Transportation in Green County, Wisconsin
Transportation in Rock County, Wisconsin